Collonista costulosa is a species of sea snail, a marine gastropod mollusk in the family Colloniidae.

Description
The height of the shell reaches 4 mm.

Distribution
This marine species occurs off Japan.

References

 Williams S.T., Karube S. & Ozawa T. (2008) Molecular systematics of Vetigastropoda: Trochidae, Turbinidae and Trochoidea redefined. Zoologica Scripta 37: 483–506

External links
 

costulosa
Gastropods described in 1886